Puerto Lucia is a hamlet belonging to the town of Cortegana, in the province of Huelva, Andalucia, Spain.

It is 630 metres above sea level and has a population of 40 people. Its main source of income is Iberian ham or Jamon, cork and rural tourism. It is set in the Sierra Morena, about 40k from the border with Portugal. Its climate is mixed Mediterranean /Atlantic with winter lows of -5c and summer highs of 45c.

Municipalities in the Province of Huelva